Uluköy is a village in the Ulus District, Bartın Province, Turkey. Its population is 363 (2021).

References

Villages in Ulus District